Thapelo Letsholo is a Botswana politician and entrepreneur. He is the current elected Member of Parliament for Kanye North constituency as of 2019. He is a member of the Botswana Democratic Party.

Early life
Thapelo Letsholo was born in Kanye, Botswana. He then attended his early education in Jwaneng, Botswana and his senior secondary education in Lobatse, Botswana. Letsholo studied Psychology and Organisational Psychology at the University of Cape Town (UCT) and graduated in 2000. He was the President of the UCT Psychology Association.

Career
Letsholo began his career in the corporate sector in 2001, he worked for some companies and by year 2008, he had excelled to Corporate Affairs & Strategy Director at Kgalagadi Breweries Limited. Upon leaving corporate in 2011, Letsholo established various entrepreneurial ventures including RedPepper PR & Communications Consultancy, Best of Publishing, and Kamoso Consulting and Drillonic. He also served as a Trustee in the Kgalagadi Beverages Trust Board of Trustees from 2011 to 2014.

Thapelo Letsholo began his political career in 2018 when he contested for Member of Parliament for Kanye North constituency in the Primary Elections that year and won. He then went on to represent the Botswana Democratic Party in the 2019 general elections and won by a record breaking margin in the history of the constituency.
 
Letsholo has had a number of Motions adopted by Parliament since coming into office, key among them include a Motion that the local distribution, courier and transportation of goods in Botswana be reserved for 100% citizen owned companies and that all foreign transport and courier companies be only allowed a single drop off once they arrive in Botswana.

Letsholo is a member of the following committees of the Botswana Parliament:

Finance and Estimates committee (Chairman) 
Finance, Trade and Economic Development
Statutory Bodies and State Enterprises
Communications, Works, Transport and Technology
Youth, Sports, Arts and Culture
Government Assurances

References

Living people
Year of birth missing (living people)
Botswana Democratic Party politicians
Members of the National Assembly (Botswana)
21st-century Botswana politicians